Brik-II is a first satellite of the Royal Netherlands Air Force. On 30 November 2017 C-LSK Dennis Luyt signed a contract with ISISpace, NLR and TU Delft. The nanosatellite is designed to provide the Royal Netherlands Air Force with intelligence regarding navigation, communication and observation of the Earth. The satellite was launched on 30 June 2021 by Virgin Orbit's LauncherOne.

Namesake
The Brik-II satellite is named after the first airplane of the Royal Netherlands Airforce, named 'Brik'.

References

Military satellites
Satellites of the Netherlands
Spacecraft launched in 2021